Tinashe Jorgensen Kachingwe (born February 6, 1993), known mononymously as Tinashe, is an American singer, dancer, and actress. Born in Lexington, Kentucky, Tinashe moved to Pasadena as a child to pursue a career in entertainment. Her notable roles included as a motion-capture model in the animated film The Polar Express (2004), Robin Wheeler in the Cartoon Network television series Out of Jimmy's Head (2007–2008), and a recurring role in the CBS series Two and a Half Men (2008–2009).

Between 2007 and 2011, Tinashe was a member of the girl group the Stunners. Following their disbandment, she released the positively-reviewed self-recorded mixtapes In Case We Die (2012) and Reverie (2012). Following their success, Tinashe signed with RCA Records and released her third mixtape, Black Water (2013). Her debut single, "2 On" (featuring Schoolboy Q; produced by Mustard), reached number one on the Rhythmic airplay chart, and peaked at number 24 on the Billboard Hot 100. Her debut studio album, Aquarius (2014), was noted by music critics as one of the most “solid” debuts by a new female artist in years. The album garnered her nominations for Soul Train and BET Awards. Her collaboration with Snakehips and Chance the Rapper, "All My Friends", won the Ivor Novello Award for Best Contemporary Song in 2016. The same year, Tinashe appeared on Britney Spears' single "Slumber Party", which topped Billboard's Dance Club Songs chart. Tinashe's second studio album, Nightride (2016), reached number eight on the Top R&B/Hip-Hop Albums chart in the US. Joyride (2018), her third studio album, peaked at number 58 on the Billboard 200 chart and reached number six on the UK R&B Albums chart. After departing RCA, Tinashe independently released her fourth and fifth studio albums, Songs for You (2019) and 333 (2021), to critical acclaim.

Tinashe describes her music as "rhythmic pop" that explores the genres of alternative R&B, pop, and hip hop.

Life and career

1993–2006: Early life
Tinashe Kachingwe was born on February 6, 1993, in Lexington, Kentucky, and is the eldest child of college professors Michael and Aimie Kachingwe. Her father is a professor who teaches acting at California State Polytechnic University, Pomona and a first generation Zimbabwean immigrant of the Shona descent, while her mother, who is of Danish, Norwegian, and Irish descent, teaches physical therapy at California State University, Northridge. Her parents met each other on a blind date during their time as undergrads at the University of Iowa. Tinashe's name means "We have God (or God is with us)" in the Shona language. She has two younger brothers, Thulani and Kudzai. She and her family moved to Los Angeles, California when she was eight years old. She attended Crescenta Valley High School for a year before finishing early to pursue a career in music full-time. During high school she faced bullying from her peers. She began studying ballet, tap, and jazz dancing at the age of 4, and continued to compete in various styles as a part of a dance company until she was 18.

2007–2011: The Stunners and acting roles

Tinashe scored roles in a number of TV shows, movies, and children's videos in the early 2000s, including the movies Cora Unashamed (2000), Call Me Claus (2001), Masked and Anonymous (2003), and two TV series: Rocket Power (2004) and Avatar: The Last Airbender (2007). These led to a regular role in the Cartoon Network TV series Out of Jimmy's Head in 2007–2008 and a recurring role on Two and a Half Men in 2008–2009. Although she was uncredited in the poorly received Masked and Anonymous, Roger Ebert observed at the film's 2003 Sundance Film Festival premiere "the one performer in the movie whose performance actually was applauded; that was a young black girl named Tinashe Kachingwe, who sings 'The Times They Are A-Changin'' with such sweetness and conviction that she is like a master class." He concluded his review of the movie: "If I had been asked to serve as consultant on this picture, my advice would have amounted to three words: more Tinashe Kachingwe."

In 2007, Tinashe joined girl group the Stunners, founded by Vitamin C. Her bandmates were friends Marisol Esparza, Allie Gonino, Hayley Kiyoko, and Kelsey Sanders. Six months after their formation, the group signed with Columbia Records, and later signed a production deal with Lionsgate Entertainment for scripted television show for MTV. On March 18, 2009, they released a single and video, "Bubblegum." In October, the group released a five-song EP, influenced by artists such as Madonna, Gwen Stefani, and Rihanna. The music video for their promo single, "We Got It", was released on February 22, 2010, and they performed the song on The Today Show and The Wendy Williams Show. After signing with Universal Republic Records in 2010 they released a single, "Dancin' Around the Truth." The music video premiered on June 2, 2010, just before the group was announced as an opening act on Justin Bieber's My World Tour.

After the Bieber tour the Stunners returned to the recording studio, but disbanded in 2011, and Tinashe began pursuing a solo career. After the Stunners disbanded, Tinashe "bought a bunch of equipment, a camera, and microphones", and began to teach herself how to record and mix music. She wrote and recorded songs in her room studio. She produced beats with Logic Pro, and also filmed and edited her own music videos with Pro Tools and Final Cut Pro. Tinashe cites YouTube as her "teacher".

On May 3, 2011, Tinashe gave her first televised solo performance during a Dodgers–Cubs game, singing "God Bless America". On June 24, 2011, Tinashe released her first solo music video, a cover of Lil Wayne's single "How to Love". The song was later released as a free digital download via Tinashe's official website. Following the video's release, Tinashe confirmed she had officially been released from her recording contract with Universal Republic. Tinashe was featured on the dance single "Artificial People" by OFM, released on September 12, 2011. On November 25, 2011 Tinashe released the music video for "Can't Say No", her first original solo song. The track samples Britney Spears's song "Blur" from her sixth studio album, Circus. The song was released for download on November 28, 2011.

2012–2014: Independent mixtapes, record deal and Aquarius

In Case We Die, Tinashe's debut solo mixtape, was released in February 2012, recorded in her home studio. The mixtape spawned four singles, the first being promotional song, "Chainless", released to iTunes on December 19, 2011. "My High" was released for streaming on her official website. The music video for single "This Feeling" directed by Cole Walliser was released on May 1, 2012 to Global Grind. The mixtape's final single, Boss, was released August 20, 2012, after the song was featured in an episode of the VH1 series Single Ladies. The music video for the song was self-directed.
The mixtape was received positively by the blogosphere.

On July 13, 2012, Tinashe announced that she had signed with RCA Records. Following the signing, her second mixtape, Reverie, was released on September 6, 2012 through her official website. The mixtape released three singles: the first "Stargazing", released on August 21, 2012; Denver Sean of LoveBScott.com noted "BMarz the Producer's flawless production" of the first single, saying "Stargazing, takes a similar approach to, Noah “40″ Shebib's productions, but it's as if he strapped one to a rocket and shot it into the galaxy." the second, "Ecstasy", released on December 18, 2012; and the final, "Who Am I Working For?", released on March 12, 2013.
Upon its release, reviews for Reverie were generally positive.

From August to November 2012, a series of remixes of songs from Tinashe's two mixtapes leaked online to critical acclaim. On November 26, 2013, Tinashe released her third mixtape, Black Water. The mixtape was composed of thirteen tracks produced by Dev Hynes, Boi-1da, Ryan Hemsworth, and Tinashe herself. The single "Vulnerable", which features rapper Travis Scott, was declared a "Must-Hear Pop Song of the Week" by MTV's Buzzworthy on November 26, 2013.

Tinashe worked on her debut studio album in 2014. Recording took place in Los Angeles, London, Atlanta, New York, and Toronto. Tinashe worked with several producers, including Clams Casino, Ryan Hemsworth, Stuart Matthewman, DJ Mustard, T-Minus, Mike Will Made It, Boi-1da, Fisticuffs, Best Kept Secret, Ritz Reynolds and London on the track. On January 13, 2014, Tinashe released her first single from her debut album, "2 On". The song features American rapper Schoolboy Q, and was produced by DJ Mustard. The song entered the US Billboard Hot 100 chart at number 89, and has since peaked at number 24.

On June 29, 2014, Tinashe made her national television debut, performing her single "2 On" at the BET Awards pre-show. That same day, she also announced that her anticipated debut album, Aquarius, would be officially released on October 7, 2014. Speaking about the theme of the album, Tinashe said: "It combines the essence of all my previous work. I've stayed true to who I am. Obviously, there's some progression as I've grown as an artist, and I'm influenced by new things and what not. I think my fans will be really happy with it. I think it really embodies who I am and where I am creatively right now".
The second single, "Pretend" featuring ASAP Rocky, was released on August 22, 2014. "Aquarius" debuted at number 17 on Billboard 200 with 18,800 copies sold in its first week.

"All Hands on Deck" became the last single off of Aquarius. Although the single failed to crack the Billboard Hot 100 charts, the music video created much buzz online by peers and fans for its choreography and visuals. Tinashe kicked the year off with a visual bang too, appearing on the cover of the Jan 15 issue of V Magazine.

2015–2017: Nightride, Joyride and touring

In late January 2015, Tinashe was reported working with writers and producers from Prescription Songs (Cirkut, Ammo, Rock City, Jakob Kasher, Chloe Angelides), Max Martin and Taylor Parks on her second studio album. On March 16, 2015, Tinashe released a seven-song mixtape entitled Amethyst for free download. The project was recorded in Tinashe's bedroom during her Christmas vacation, and features production from Ryan Hemsworth, Iamsu!, DJ Dahi, Smash David, Ritz Reynolds, Nez & Rio and Mae N. Maejor. In between time, Tinashe invested in several self-directed music videos from her album Aquarius such as "Aquarius", "Bated Breath", "Cold Sweat", and "Bet/Feels Like Vegas" with no label support.

On September 2, 2015, Tinashe released a teaser for her then second studio album Joyride on YouTube. She explained to Billboard the meaning behind the title: "I always had it in the back of my head, but it started to become more and more relevant to my current state of my career. With all this traveling I've done this past year and everything I've gone through, it just really feels like an adventure, a journey, a ride", and when asked why she feels she isn't being heard she stated, "I feel like I've been working really hard this year at developing a fan base, a touring base. I'm continuing to grow, but you always feel like you're a little bit under appreciated, undervalued. Especially for me, it's exciting to have new music and to give people a chance to rediscover me again."

On September 9, Tinashe leaked the buzz single called "Party Favors" featuring rapper Young Thug as a way to get the ball rolling from her label. On October 2, 2015, Tinashe released another song "Player", featuring Chris Brown. On October 21, 2015, Tinashe was featured on British electronic duo Snakeships' track All My Friends which also featured Chance the Rapper which reached the top 20 in five countries.

In the summer of 2015 Tinashe joined Nicki Minaj for U.S. concerts on the Pinkprint Tour, and in September and October she toured South America with Katy Perry on the Prismatic World Tour. Meanwhile, she was featured in a November 2015 fashion spread in Vogue, and was the cover feature in the Winter 2015 issue of Dazed magazine.

Tinashe announced the Joyride World Tour on January 12, 2016, to support the album Joyride. Beginning in February 2016, it was scheduled through May 2016 including dates in North America, Europe, Asia, and Oceania. The tour was ultimately canceled as Tinashe wanted to focus on making new songs for the album. Tinashe also revealed another promotional single, "Ride of Your Life", on February 2, 2016.

In February 2016, MAC Cosmetics announced a limited-edition collaboration with Tinashe for its #MACFutureForward campaign, along with Halsey, Lion Babe, and Dej Loaf. In April she was again featured in Vogue

During the summer, Tinashe was set to debut on Hot 97's Summer Jam main stage as the only female artist but the event was canceled due to an extreme weather alert. On July 15, 2016, Tinashe released a new single "Superlove". The music video directed by Hannah Lux Davis made its debut on August 12, 2016, on MTV's Snapchat and gained rave reviews. The video on YouTube reached one million views in just a day and a half. On September 15, 2016, Tinashe performed her new song "Company" on MTV's Wonderland. Unlike her previous work, "Company" was written by The-Dream without Tinashe as co-writer. On October 25, 2016, Tinashe was confirmed working with American singer Britney Spears for a remix version of Spears' song, "Slumber Party".

Tinashe appeared on the cover of Nylons October 2016 issue, just as designer brand Alexander Wang was collaborating with her in a video for its Fall 2016 campaign.

On November 4, 2016, Tinashe released a digital album and short film titled Nightride which she said had been in production for two years alongside her Joyride album. Rolling Stone described Nightride as "dark, alluring and dangerous".

In March 2017, Tinashe joined Maroon 5 on the Maroon V Tour. The same month, Pepsi, in association with iHeartMedia, Shazam, and Viacom, announced that Tinashe would join its music platform, The Sound Drop. On March 16, Tinashe premiered a new single, "Flame". It was also confirmed that Tinashe would appear in the new season of Empire. On April 2, 2017, as part of WrestleMania 33 in Orlando, Tinashe performed "America the Beautiful" in front of a crowd of 75,000 – the largest crowd ever assembled at the Orlando Citrus Bowl.

In June she appeared at two concerts with Aaron Carter at Hot 107.9's Birthday Bash. In August 2017 she was the cover feature, along with an interview, in Galore. On September 22, 2017 she headlined Bronco Fusion at Cal Poly Pomona.

On July 11, 2017, Tinashe stated that she is working on her second album, Joyride, with producers Mike WiLL Made It, TM88, Metro Boomin, Diplo, Boi-1da, Charlie Handsome and others. On January 18, 2018, she released "No Drama" featuring Offset, the lead single from her long-anticipated album, Joyride. "Faded Love" featuring Future was released as the second single on February 12, 2018. Joyride was released on April 13, 2018.

2018–2020: Television, departure from RCA, and Songs for You
On June 9, 2018, record producer Hitmaka revealed his role as executive producer on Tinashe's upcoming album titled Nashe. The lead single "Like I Used To" was released on July 13, 2018. The project's second single "Throw a Fit" was released on July 26, 2018, with the album's cover as the single artwork. In August, rumors of Nashe being cancelled circulated the internet, with further speculation being followed after Tinashe posted a screenshot of a page error from RCA's website on Instagram. On September 12, Tinashe was announced as one of the celebrities who will compete on season 27 of Dancing with the Stars. Her professional partner was Brandon Armstrong. Despite consistently receiving high scores, Tinashe and Armstrong were the fourth couple to be eliminated from the competition on October 15. In the same month, Tinashe performed at Austin City Limits Festival.

Fox announced a live adaption to the musical Rent, as Rent: Live, in which Tinashe portrayed the lead female role of Mimi Marquez, an exotic dancer who struggles with addiction and HIV. Promotional videos and series of pictures were released featuring Tinashe and other cast members in rehearsal and costumes during the lead up to the airing. As a fan of the musical since middle school, she tells US Weekly on her role and the musical overall, "It still has a lot of the topics that are definitely not necessarily children topics, but I think it's important because they're very relevant and we deal with them in a beautiful, awesome, fun, exciting way". The musical aired on Fox on January 27, 2019. The television special received five Primetime Emmy Awards.

In February 2019, Tinashe's manager announced she had parted ways with RCA, stating that the "positive split" was "giving her back creative control." After her departure, Hot New HipHop published a report believing she was in the midst of being courted by multiple major labels. She signed a management deal with Roc Nation on November 7. Tinashe released her first self-released studio album, Songs for You, on November 20. The album has been described by Idolator and The Cut as "excellent", with The Wall Street Journals Ben Dandridge-Lemco suggesting that it is "tough to find a negative review about the project anywhere." On July 17, 2020, nearly eight months after the release of Songs for You, Tinashe released the single "Rascal (Superstar)".

In August, Tinashe confirmed she would be featured on Iggy Azalea's single "Dance Like Nobody's Watching". The song was their second collaboration together after 2015's "All Hands on Deck" remix. The song charted in Scotland and genre charts in the US.

On November 25, 2020, Tinashe released a Christmas EP titled Comfort & Joy. The project marked her second release since leaving RCA.

2021–present: 333 and Choreo Cage Fight 

On May 28, 2021, Tinashe posted a cryptic teaser for her fifth studio album on her social media accounts. The teaser included the caption "333", which was speculated to be the title for her fifth album, along with a new logo designed by Franc Fernandez. The album's lead single, "Pasadena", was released on June 4, and features American rapper Buddy. On July 9, Tinashe released a new single "Bouncin". Following the release, Tinashe announced the 333 Tour on July 12, which began in September 2021. On July 22, Tinashe announced the release date of 333 as August 6, 2021, and released the song "I Can See the Future" the same day. The album was met with positive critical reception. The song and music video for Bouncin gathered a lot of media attention, with the likes of Little Mix and Doja Cat expressing their love for the song.
Tinashe was the first artist to be announced to be featured on the rebooted MTV Cribs, where she showed her Los Angeles house in the Hollywood hills including her home studio. The year ended with the announcement of her new Facebook Watch show Choreo Cage Fight, premiering December 3. Tinashe was also named in Forbes 30 Under 30 list for 2022.

On July 29, 2022, Tinashe released the single "New to You" alongside Calvin Harris, Normani and Offset, for Harris' album Funk Wav Bounces Vol. 2.

Artistry

Musical style and influences

Tinashe's musical style has been described as R&B, pop, and alternative R&B. Tinashe said she writes her songs and is open to writing collaborations with other artists. Her writing consists of "things that are relative to me and my life; whether that's relationships I've had or relationships that people I know are in, because I can put myself into other people's mindstates and write from that point of view too". She also likes to write about society; "different things that affect me day to day from more of a philosophical standpoint rather than just the obvious stuff." Her mixtapes have been more experimental, incorporating elements of traditional R&B, electro-hop and dark pop.

Regarding her musical style, she is "really inspired by R&B, hip-hop, and alternative music". 

Tinashe said in 2016 she feels she does not "fit into any particular genre." She later said she considers herself "a pop artist who makes R&B-tinged pop music". In the early stages of her career, she was often compared to and considered the successor to Ciara, whom she cites as an inspiration. Her style has also been compared to Janet Jackson, Aaliyah, and James Blake. Tinashe was inspired by the music her parents would play in the house when she was young. She considers Britney Spears, Michael Jackson, Janet Jackson, Sade, Christina Aguilera, James Blake, the xx, and SBTRKT as significant influences on her.

Personal life
Tinashe resides in Los Angeles, has a bedroom studio, and has a black belt in Taekwondo. In 2016, Tinashe resided with her family in La Crescenta, a suburb 20 miles north of Los Angeles. She was in a relationship with Australian basketball player Ben Simmons from November 2017 to May 2018. In June 2020, she attended the George Floyd protests in Los Angeles.

Discography

 Aquarius (2014)
 Nightride (2016)
 Joyride (2018)
 Songs for You (2019)
 333 (2021)

Tours
Headlining
 Aquarius Tour (2014–2015)
 Joyride Tour (2016)
 333 Tour (2021)

Opening act
 Justin Bieber's My World Tour (2010; as The Stunners)
 Nicki Minaj's The Pinkprint Tour (2015)
 Iggy Azalea's The Great Escape Tour (2015; cancelled)
 Katy Perry's The Prismatic World Tour (2015)
 Beyoncé's The Formation World Tour (2016)
 Maroon 5's Maroon V Tour (2017)
 Flume's Flume World Tour (2022)

Stage

Filmography

Awards and nominations

References

External links

 
 

 
1993 births
Living people
20th-century American actresses
21st-century American actresses
21st-century American women singers
Actresses from Kentucky
Actresses from Los Angeles
American child actresses
American child singers
American contemporary R&B singers
American dance musicians
American women pop singers
American film actresses
American hip hop singers
American people of Danish descent
American people of Irish descent
American people of Norwegian descent
American people of Zimbabwean descent
American television actresses
American voice actresses
American women record producers
Artists from Lexington, Kentucky
Child pop musicians
Film producers from California
Kentucky women musicians
People from La Crescenta-Montrose, California
Record producers from California
Record producers from Kentucky
Roc Nation artists
Shona people
Singers from Los Angeles
Singers from Kentucky
Songwriters from California
American female taekwondo practitioners
21st-century American singers
African-American women musicians